In molecular biology, SNORA19 (also known as ACA19) is a member of the H/ACA class of small nucleolar RNA that guide the sites of modification of uridines to pseudouridines.

The family also includes the mouse sequence MBI-51.

References

External links 
 

Small nuclear RNA